Gorton Ministry may refer to:

 First Gorton Ministry
 Second Gorton Ministry